Sharpenhoe is a small village in Bedfordshire, England, at the foot of the hills known as the Sharpenhoe Clappers, which are within the Chilterns AONB. Smithcombe, Sharpenhoe and Sundon Hills is a Site of Special Scientific Interest, and most of it is a National Trust property. It is in the civil parish of Streatley.

Woburn abbey had interests in Sharpenhoe.

Transport  

References

External links

Sharpenhoe Clappers - Chilterns AONB
BBC Three Counties - Sharpenhoe Clappers
Parishes: Streatley with Sharpenhoe, British History Online

Villages in Bedfordshire
Central Bedfordshire District